The Volkspolizei-Bereitschaften (VPB, German for "People's Police Alert Units") were paramilitary police units of the German Democratic Republic (East Germany) from 1955 to 1990. The VPB were barracked units of the Volkspolizei for riot control and counterinsurgency with regiment status, under control of the Ministry of the Interior and considered part of the armed forces, but were never part of the National People's Army or the Ministry of National Defence. 

The VPB were organized as Internal Troops like in many Warsaw Pact countries. The VPB functioned as the de facto armed branch of the Ministry for State Security (Stasi), the secret police force of the German Democratic Republic, although this ministry had its own military unit, the "Felix Dzerzhinsky Guards Regiment" as well.

Organization
The German Democratic Republic's Ministry of the Interior (German: Ministerium des Innern, or MdI) maintained the independent Department of the Alert Units of the Volkspolizei (the country's main law enforcement agency) known as the Volkspolizei-Bereitschaften (VPB). It consisted of between 12,000 and 15,000 men  in 21 Volkspolizei Alert Units of battalion strength. 

There was usually one unit per district of East Germany, but the key districts of Halle, Leipzig and Magdeburg, with their large working class populations, and Potsdam all had two units. 

The Presidium of the People's Police in East Berlin had three units located in Basdorf.

Each Alert unit was organized as follows:
Headquarters section
Four alert companies:
One mechanized company in wheeled armoured personnel carriers
Three motorized companies in trucks
Support company
Anti-tank platoon with three 45 mm/57 mm anti-tank guns (later ATGMs)
Artillery platoon with three 76.2 mm ZiS-3 field/anti-tank guns
Mortar platoon with three 82 mm mortars
Headquarters and staff company with:
signals platoon
engineer platoon
chemical platoon
reconnaissance platoon
transport platoon
supply platoon
control section
medical section

Equipment
These units were equipped with light and medium infantry weapons, SK-1 wheeled armoured personnel carriers, SK-2 water cannon (both armoured and unarmoured versions) and buses. Their uniform was the standard Volkspolizei grey-green. The political reliability of the Alert Units was of particular importance to the Socialist Unity Party of Germany (SED) as they would be used against the population in the event of social disorders such as the strike of 17 June 1953 in the industrial areas of East Germany.

See also
 Bereitschaftspolizei
 ZOMO Polish counterpart

References 

Volkspolizei
Defunct police units of East Germany